The sharp-billed canastero or lesser canastero (Asthenes pyrrholeuca) is a species of bird in the family Furnariidae, the ovenbirds.

The sharp-billed canastero is a resident breeding species in central and southern Argentina and the eastern border Andean cordillera of Chile; some birds migrate north as far as the southwest border of Paraguay, the southern border region of Bolivia, and western Uruguay, in the austral winter. Its natural habitats are subtropical or tropical dry shrubland, subtropical or tropical high-altitude shrubland, and temperate grassland. Two subspecies are recognized:
Asthenes pyrrholeuca pyrrholeuca (Vieillot, 1817) - Argentina 
Asthenes pyrrholeuca sordida (Lesson, 1839) - Chile and Argentina

References

External links
Photo gallery - VIREO
Sounds - xeno-canto

Asthenes
Birds of Argentina
Birds of Uruguay
Birds of Paraguay
Birds of Bolivia
Birds of Chile
Birds described in 1817
Taxonomy articles created by Polbot
Taxa named by Louis Jean Pierre Vieillot